Bruce Alan Lewandowski, CSsR (born June 8, 1967) is an American bishop of the Roman Catholic Church and a member of the Redemptorists.  He has been serving as an auxiliary bishop of the Archdiocese of Baltimore in Maryland, since 2020.  He previously served in New York City, Saint Lucia, and Pennsylvania.

Early life
Lewandowski was born in Toledo, Ohio, on June 8, 1967, to Robert and Frances Lewandowski.  He grew up on a family farm in Lima, Ohio, with his four siblings. Lewandowski attended St. Gerard Elementary School in Lima and minor seminary at St. Mary’s College in Erie, Pennsylvania.  He subsequently attended Saint Alphonsus College in Suffield, Connecticut, and Holy Redeemer College in Washington, D.C. Starting in 1988, Lewandowski studied theology at Washington Theological Union in Washington.  Lewandowski also learned Spanish in anticipation of being assigned to missions run by the Redemptorists in the Dominican Republic or Paraguay.

Presbyteral ministry
On May 7, 1994, Lewandowski was ordained by Bishop William Curlin to the priesthood for the Redemptorist order at the Basilica of the National Shrine of the Immaculate Conception in Washington, D.C.

Lewandowski's first pastoral assignment was in the Archdiocese of New York as parish vicar at St. Cecilia Parish in Manhattan.  Two years later, he was transferred to Immaculate Conception Parish in the Bronx in New York City.  He was subsequently assigned as a missionary to Vieux Fort, Saint Lucia in 1998, and remained there until 2000.  He then returned to the United States to become pastor at St. Boniface Parish in the Archdiocese of Philadelphia.  He then served as pastor of the Church of the Visitation of the Blessed Virgin Mary Parish in Kensington, Pennsylvania from 2006 to 2011.

Lewandowski served as the vicar for cultural ministries in Philadelphia from 2011 until late 2015, when he became pastor of Sacred Heart of Jesus Parish in Highlandtown, Baltimore.  He also became a leader in Baltimoreans United in Leadership Development (BUILD), and collaborated with the group in October 2018 to create a parish identity card.  This was especially beneficial for parishioners at Sacred Heart who were  undocumented immigrants.  Lewandowski described planned raids by the U.S. Immigration and Customs Enforcement in June 2019, which would target immigrant communities, as "an act of domestic terrorism".  He became Archbishop William Lori's interim delegate for Hispanic ministry on August 22, 2019.

Episcopal ministry
Lewandowski was appointed auxiliary bishop of the Archdiocese of Baltimore and titular bishop of Croae on June 10, 2020.  He was consecrated by Archbishop Lori on August 18, 2020, at the Cathedral of Mary Our Queen in Baltimore.  Lewandowski was named urban vicar for the archdiocese in September 2021, succeeding Denis J. Madden.

See also

 Catholic Church hierarchy
 Catholic Church in the United States
 Historical list of the Catholic bishops of the United States
 List of Catholic bishops of the United States
 Lists of patriarchs, archbishops, and bishops

References

External links
Roman Catholic Archdiocese of Baltimore Official Site

Episcopal succession

1967 births
21st-century Roman Catholic bishops in the United States
Living people
People from Toledo, Ohio
Redemptorist bishops
Bishops appointed by Pope Francis